This is a list of operational geothermal power stations with a current installed capacity of at least 10 MW.

The Geysers in California, United States is the largest geothermal power station in the world with a nameplate capacity of 1,590 MW and an annual generation of 6,516 GWh in 2018.

Geothermal power stations

Notes

Proposed

See also 
 Geothermal power
 List of largest geothermal power stations in the world

References

External links

Geothermal
 
Geothermal
Geothermal power stations